George Vaara (May 26, 1899 – July 26, 1976) was mayor of Anchorage, Alaska from 1940 to 1941.

Biography
George Vaara was born May 26, 1899, in Ada, Minnesota. He moved to Anchorage in 1923 and worked as a clerk in a Piggly Wiggly grocery store. In the 1930s, he opened a notions store called Vaara Varieties. He was elected president of the Anchorage School Board in 1939.

Vaara was elected mayor in 1940 in the midst of a housing shortage brought on by the arrival of military personnel preceding the construction of Fort Richardson. He served a single term.

Vaara built a Pepsi-Cola plant on Fifth Avenue in 1943, selling it fifteen years later.

In 1958, Vaara made a bid for nomination as the Republican candidate for governor of the new state of Alaska. He withdrew several days later, citing a "heated controversy" between factions of the party.

Vaara moved to Seattle, Washington in 1960. He died at his home in Seattle on July 26, 1976, following a year of incapacitation due to a stroke.

References

 

1899 births
1976 deaths
People from Ada, Minnesota
Mayors of Anchorage, Alaska
Alaska Republicans
American people of Finnish descent
20th-century American politicians